Marcel Aarts (born 9 August 1983) is a Dutch retired basketball player.

Career
Aarts started his career with the EiffelTowers Den Bosch, and played here for 9 seasons. After playing two seasons for Matrixx Magixx from Wijchen, Aarts returned to Den Bosch in the summer of 2013.

On 5 January 2017, Aarts signed a new contract with New Heroes Den Bosch. On 12 January 2018, Aarst returned from his retirement to sign a short-period contract for Den Bosch, which was dealing with several injuries.

References

External links
Dutch Basketball League profile and statistics 
Eurobasket.com profile

1983 births
Living people
Dutch Basketball League players
Dutch men's basketball players
Matrixx Magixx players
Heroes Den Bosch players
People from Maasdriel
Centers (basketball)
Sportspeople from Gelderland